

Aquarion AG, headquartered in Baar, Switzerland, is a company specialising in wastewater treatment and water purification systems for the oil and gas industry, the energy sector, and other process industries.

History 
In June 2014, Aquarion acquired Hager + Elsässer out of insolvency. 
On 22 July 2015, Aquarion entered an agreement with Canadian BluMetric Environmental Inc., under which the companies will jointly address wastewater issues.
Also in 2015, Aquarion established wholly owned subsidiary in the UAE.

2019 IPO 
Aquarion AG is looking to complete its IPO in 2019.

Acquisitions

Logo 

The company earlier used another logo. Consisting of an "a".

References 

Engineering companies of Switzerland
Canton of Zug